The vice president of Benin is the second highest political position in Benin. The vice presidency was created by the 2019 amendments made to the Constitution of Benin. The vice president is elected concurrently with the president in direct popular elections.

The vice presidency was created to ensure succession in case of a vacancy in the presidency. The vice president can have other tasks entrusted to them by the president.

Vice presidents of Dahomey

Vice presidents of Benin

See also

 Benin
 Politics of Benin
 President of Benin

References

1960 establishments in the Republic of Dahomey
2019 establishments in Benin
Government of Benin
 
Benin